Sebastian Hardie were Australia's first symphonic rock band. They formed in Sydney in 1967 as Sebastian Hardie Blues Band but dropped the 'Blues Band' reference when they became pop-oriented. By 1973 they developed a more progressive rock style, and later performed as Windchase, but disbanded in 1977. An early member of Sebastian Hardie was Jon English (vocals, rhythm guitar), who starred as Judas Iscariot in the Australian version of the stage musical Jesus Christ Superstar in 1972, he subsequently had a solo career as a singer, actor and playwright. A later member, Mario Millo (lead guitar, mandolin, vocals) became a multi-award winner for his television and movie music.

Sebastian Hardie's other early members included Graham Ford (lead guitar), Anatole Kononewsky (keyboards), Peter Plavsic (bass guitar) and his brother Alex Plavsic (drums). After English, Kononewsky and Ford had left, the Plavsic brothers were joined by Millo and Toivo Pilt (keyboards). With their addition, Sebastian Hardie developed extended progressive rock tracks to become a symphonic rock group before they released their definitive album Four Moments in 1975, which peaked at No. 12 on the National albums chart. They followed with a second album Windchase in 1976, but it had less chart success. Millo and Pilt formed the band, Windchase, to release Symphinity in 1977, it was a heavier jazz-fusion album but didn't have chart success and they disbanded.

History

1967–1973: Early years

Guitarist Graham Ford (ex-The Interns) made up the name 'Sebastian Hardie' when he founded Sebastian Hardie Blues Band in 1967 in Sydney. Variable line-ups included John Bellamy (bass guitar), Dennis Laughlin (vocals, later in Sherbet), Richard Lillico (ex-The Interns, drums), Syd Richmond (drums), Dave Waddington (vocals) and Neil Williamson (organ). They played R&B and soul covers but disbanded in early 1968. When Ford reformed the band later in the year, he recruited students from Sydney's Cabramatta High School, Jon English on vocals and rhythm guitar, Anatole Kononewsky on keyboard, Peter Plavsic (ex-The Interns) on bass guitar,  and his brother Alex Plavsic on drums. They dropped the 'Blues Band' part to play more pop-oriented music and were the backing band for legendary Australian rocker Johnny O'Keefe during 1969. Covering songs from Rolling Stones, The Beatles, Otis Redding and Wilson Pickett they built a reputation in the Sydney pub scene. Late in 1971, English left Sebastian Hardie when he won the role of Judas Iscariot in the Australian stage production of Jesus Christ Superstar from May 1972. He was eventually replaced by Steve Dunne on vocals and keyboards. British singer Larry Page produced Sebastian Hardie's first single "All Right Now" in September 1973 on RCA Records.

1973–1977: Four Moments and Windchase

Ford left Sebastian Hardie by October 1973 to be replaced by Mario Millo on lead guitar. They recorded a second single "Day After Day" released in April 1974. By this time Tovio Pilt had replaced Dunne on keyboards and Millo took over on vocals. Besides covers they were playing original progressive rock material. They were Australia's first symphonic rock band and performed a 20-minute version of Mike Oldfield's Tubular Bells as part of their set; Millo was now writing more orchestrated and inventive original material. After signing to Polydor Records they supported tours by international acts Lou Reed and Osibisa during 1974. Their first LP, Four Moments, which peaked at No. 12 on the Australian Kent Music Report Albums Chart, was released in August 1975. Produced by former member Jon English, it achieved Gold status – selling 35,000 copies, while the related single "Rosanna", an instrumental track, peaked at No. 55 on the Kent Music Report Singles Chart. Four Moments showed the influence of progressive rock groups from Europe, including Genesis, Yes, King Crimson and Focus. It contained only three tracks with the title track taking up one side; Sebastian Hardie displayed "seamless, dramatic arrangements and impeccable musicianship".

Windchase, their second album, was released in February 1976, then they supported the national tour by Santana and released a single "Life, Love and Music", but neither album nor single had any Top 50 chart success. In June, management and internal disagreements led to the Plavsic brothers leaving and an ensuing court decision awarded the band name to Peter Plavsic; consequently Millo and Pilt combined under the name Windchase. They added Doug Nethercote (bass guitar) and Doug Bligh (drums) for the new rhythm section. The Plavsic brothers became backing musicians for The Studs, a Rock n Roll revival group. Windchase played Sebastian Hardie's material which had been written by Millo and by 1977 started recording Symphinity, which was more jazz-fusion oriented. During album sessions, Nethercote left to be replaced by  Duncan McGuire (bass guitar, ex-Doug Parkinson in Focus, Ayers Rock). When the album was released in June, McGuire and Bligh were replaced by Nethercote's return and new member Ralph Cooper (drums). Singles from the album were "Glad to Be Alive" in May and "Flight Call" in October, but neither album nor singles had any chart success. Windchase toured through to October 1977 but the emerging punk and new wave music forms resulted in poor concert audiences and Windchase disbanded.

After the separation

Ford was a member of Sydney-based band, Pleasure Master in 1986 on guitar and vocals.
Millo worked with Jon English on the 1978 TV series Against the Wind soundtrack, and the associated single "Six Ribbons" peaked at No. 8 on the national charts; both the album and its title track were translated as "Mot Alla Vindar" and peaked at No. 1 on the Norwegian albums and singles charts respectively. Millo also released solo albums Epic III in November 1979, Human Games  in March 1983 and Oceans of the Mind in 2002. He became better known through his television and movie soundtrack production winning six industry awards for work in The Lighthorsemen (1987), G.P. (1989), Brides of Christ (1991, two awards), See How They Run (1999) and Changi (2001). Original soundtracks released include Against the Wind (1978, with Jon English), World Safari II (1984), A Fortunate Life (1986), The Lighthorsemen (1989) and Brides of Christ (1991).

In 1989, Anatole Kononewsky produced the first of three short documentaries, the first. "What If... A new global option" with an introduction by the international singer John Denver. Kononewsky wrote a song called "See the World in You" for the launch of the documentary at the Darling Harbour Convention Centre.

Sebastian Hardie briefly reformed in 1994 – with the Plavsic brothers, Millo and Pilt – to perform at a progressive rock festival, ProgFest, in Los Angeles, which was recorded and eventually released as Sebastian Hardie – Live in L.A. in 1997. They played material from Four Moments, Windchase, Symphinity, and Epic III. At the Gimme Ted benefit concert on 10 March 2001 Sebastian Hardie performed "Openings" and then backed former member, Jon English, for two of his songs. Another reunion occurred in 2003 when supporting the British art rock band, Yes on their Australian tour.

Pilt played keyboards for Ross Ryan during 1979–1983. Since 2004 he recorded CDs with Sydney "progressive chill" band Tramtracks, with Robert Forbes (keyboards, theremin), Mark Hudson on guitar (who had worked with James Reyne before Australian Crawl) and Graeme James on drums.

In 2011 Sebastian Hardie released a new album, Blueprint, through their website.

On 26 October 2022, 50 years after Anatole Kononewsky left the band, Kononewsky released the song, "Heart of Australia"  featuring Tarryn Stokes on lead vocals. Kononewsky co-wrote the song with multi-platinum award winning songwriter / producers, Barbara Hannan and Adrian Hannan. “Blue Sky Walking” refers to the spirit of everyone involved in the production of the song, “Heart of Australia” — the writers and performers. The song is for everyone - for all Australians to celebrate and unite the country. It inspired the initiative, Heart of Australia (26 October) founded by Kononewsky.

On 31 October 2022, Kononewsky also digitally released for the first time his album. "Only love matters: music for Soft Diamond Light" The album is a part of the Soft Diamond Light Artwork Production. It was created to be listened from start to finish at one time. It has been designed to create a specific electromagnetic sound signature for raising the inner state of your being and/or the vibratory atmosphere of surroundings. It is planned to use the 15 tracks of music for a special contemporary ballet production that is currently being developed.

Members
Sebastian Hardie Blues Band (1967–1968)
Dennis Laughlin – vocals (1967–1968)
Dave Waddington – vocals (1967–1968)
Graham Ford – lead guitar (1967–1973)
Neil Williamson – organ (1967–1968)
John Bellamy – bass guitar (1967–1968)
Richard Lillico – drums (1967–1968)
Syd Richmond – drums (1967–1968)

Sebastian Hardie (1968–1976)
Jon English – vocals, rhythm guitar (1968–1971), producer (1975)
Graham Ford – lead guitar (1967–1973)
Anatole Kononewsky – keyboards (1968–1972)
Mario Millo – vocals, lead guitar, mandolin (1973–1977)
Steve Dunne – vocals, keyboards (1972–1974)
Toivo Pilt – keyboards (Hammond C3 L-111 organ, grand piano, Mellotron; Minimoog & Solina String Ensemble synthesizers) vocals (1974–1977)
Peter Plavsic – bass guitar (1968–1976)
Doug Nethercote – bass guitar (1976–1977)
Alex Plavsic – drums, percussion (1968–1976)

Windchase (1976–1977)
Mario Millo – vocals, lead guitar (1973–1977)
Toivo Pilt – keyboards (Hammond C3 L-111 organ, grand piano, Fender Rhodes electric piano, Hohner Clavinet D6, Mellotron; Minimoog, ARP 2600, Solina String Ensemble & ARP Omni string synthesizers), guitar, vocals (1974–1977)
Doug Nethercote – bass guitar (1976–1977)
Duncan McGuire – bass guitar (1977)
Doug Bligh – drums (1976–1977)
Ralph Cooper – drums (1977)

Discography

Albums

Charting singles

Awards

Australian Record Awards

|-
| 1975
| Sebastian Hardie for Four Moments
| Best Australian-Designed Cover
| 
|}

References

General
  Note: Archived [on-line] copy has limited functionality.
 
Specific

External links
Mario Millo official website www.MarioMillo.com
Sebastian Hardie official website www.SebastianHardie.com.au

 Sebastian Hardie discography and album reviews, credits & releases at AllMusic
 Sebastian Hardie discography, album releases & credits at Discogs
 Sebastian Hardie at MusicBrainz
 Sebastian Hardie at Rate Your Music
 Sebastian Hardie albums to be listened on Spotify
 Sebastian Hardie albums to be listened on YouTube
 Windchase discography and album reviews, credits & releases at AllMusic
 Windchase discography, album releases & credits at Discogs
 Windchase at MusicBrainz
 Windchase albums to be listened on Spotify
 Windchase albums to be listened on YouTube
 Windchase at Rate Your Music
 Sebastian Hardie - Blueprint (2011) album review at Prog-Sphere.com

Musical groups established in 1967
Musical groups disestablished in 1977
New South Wales musical groups
Australian progressive rock groups